The New Zealand men's national under-18 ice hockey team is the men's national under-18 ice hockey team of New Zealand. The team is controlled by the New Zealand Ice Hockey Federation, a member of the International Ice Hockey Federation. The team represents New Zealand at the IIHF World U18 Championships.

International competitions

IIHF Asian Oceanic U18 Championships

1998: 5th place
1999: 3rd in Division II
2000: 1st in Division II
2001: 4th place
2002:  3rd place

IIHF World U18 Championships

 
2003: 4th in Division III Group A
2004: 3rd in Division III
2005: 4th in Division III
2006: 4th in Division III
2007: 4th in Division III
2008: 3rd in Division III Group A
2009: 2nd in Division III Group A
2010: 1st in Division III Group B

2011: 6th in Division II Group A
2012: 2nd in Division III
2013: 2nd in Division III Group A
2014: 6th in Division III Group A
2015: 2nd in Division III Group B
2016: 1st in Division III Group B
2017: 6th in Division III Group A

External links
New Zealand at IIHF.com

under-18
National under-18 ice hockey teams